In mathematics, the Hirzebruch–Riemann–Roch theorem, named after Friedrich Hirzebruch, Bernhard Riemann, and Gustav Roch, is Hirzebruch's 1954 result generalizing the classical Riemann–Roch theorem on Riemann surfaces to all complex algebraic varieties of higher dimensions. The result paved the way for the Grothendieck–Hirzebruch–Riemann–Roch theorem proved about three years later.

Statement of Hirzebruch–Riemann–Roch theorem
The  Hirzebruch–Riemann–Roch theorem applies to any holomorphic vector bundle E on a compact complex manifold X, to calculate the holomorphic Euler characteristic of E in sheaf cohomology, namely the alternating sum

of the dimensions as complex vector spaces, where n is the complex dimension of X.

Hirzebruch's theorem states that χ(X, E) is computable in terms of the Chern classes ck(E) of E, and the Todd classes  of the holomorphic tangent bundle of X. These all lie in the cohomology ring of X; by use of the fundamental class (or, in other words, integration over X) we can obtain numbers from classes in  The Hirzebruch formula asserts that

where the sum is taken over all relevant j (so 0 ≤ j ≤ n), using the Chern character ch(E) in cohomology. In other words, the  products are formed in the cohomology ring of all the 'matching' degrees that add up to 2n. Formulated differently, it gives the equality

where  is the Todd class of the tangent bundle of X.

Significant special cases are when E is a complex line bundle, and when X is an algebraic surface (Noether's formula). Weil's Riemann–Roch theorem for vector bundles on curves, and the Riemann–Roch theorem for algebraic surfaces (see below), are included in its scope. The formula also expresses in a precise way the vague notion that the Todd classes are in some sense reciprocals of characteristic classes.

Riemann Roch theorem for curves
For curves, the Hirzebruch–Riemann–Roch theorem is essentially the classical Riemann–Roch theorem. To see this, recall that for each divisor D on a curve there is an invertible sheaf O(D) (which corresponds to a line bundle) such that the linear system of D is more or less the space of sections of O(D).

  (integrated over X).

But h0(O(D)) is just l(D), the dimension of the linear system of D, and by Serre duality h1(O(D)) = h0(O(K − D)) = l(K − D) where K is the canonical divisor. Moreover, c1(O(D)) integrated over X is the degree of D, and c1(T(X)) integrated over X is the Euler class 2 − 2g of the curve X, where g is the genus. So we get the classical Riemann Roch theorem

 

For vector bundles V, the Chern character is rank(V) + c1(V), so we get Weil's Riemann Roch theorem for vector bundles over curves:

Riemann Roch theorem for surfaces

For surfaces, the Hirzebruch–Riemann–Roch theorem is essentially the Riemann–Roch theorem for surfaces

 

combined with the Noether formula.

If we want, we can use Serre duality to express h2(O(D)) as h0(O(K − D)), but unlike the case of curves there is in general no easy way to write the h1(O(D)) term in a form not involving sheaf cohomology (although in practice it often vanishes).

Asymptotic Riemann–Roch

Let D be an ample Cartier divisor on an irreducible projective variety X of dimension n. Then

More generally, if  is any coherent sheaf on X then

See also 

 Grothendieck–Riemann–Roch theorem - contains many computations and examples
 Hilbert polynomial - HRR can be used to compute Hilbert polynomials

References
 Friedrich Hirzebruch,Topological Methods in Algebraic Geometry

External links
 The Hirzebruch-Riemann-Roch Theorem

Topological methods of algebraic geometry
Theorems in complex geometry
Theorems in algebraic geometry
Bernhard Riemann